The Gen. John Williams House is a historic house at 62 High Street in Bangor, Maine.  Built in the early 1820s, it is believed to be the oldest brick house in the city, and one of its only examples of Federal architecture.  It was built by John Williams, a leading businessman and militia commander of the period.  The house was listed on the National Register of Historic Places in 1978.

Description and history
The Williams House is set on the north side of High Street, a short, predominantly residential, side street near Bangor's central business district.  The house is a -story brick structure, five bays wide and three deep, with a side gable roof and four side chimneys.  The centered entry is recessed in a wide opening with a granite lintel, with paneled sides, sidelight windows, and a fan above.  Windows are plain sash windows with granite sills and lintels, and with shutters on the front facade.

John Williams was a successful local businessman, who served in the local band of state militia during the War of 1812 and later, eventually being commissioned a brigadier general in 1828.  Williams acquired the lot this house stands on in 1822, and in 1825 was taxed for the house's presence.  Williams was a significant presence in the civic scene, serving in the local fire brigade, as president of the local library association, and as registrar of probate for the county.  He sold the house in 1835 to Dr. William Mason, in whose family it remained until the 1950s.

See also
National Register of Historic Places listings in Penobscot County, Maine

References

Houses on the National Register of Historic Places in Maine
Federal architecture in Maine
Houses completed in 1822
Houses in Bangor, Maine
National Register of Historic Places in Bangor, Maine
1822 establishments in Maine